Robert Daniel Zehr, Sr. (April 18, 1916 – August 4, 2001) was an American competition swimmer who represented the United States at the 1932 Summer Olympics in Los Angeles, California.  Zehr placed fourth in the men's 100-meter backstroke, finishing with a time of 1:10.9.

See also
 List of Northwestern University alumni

External links
 

1916 births
2001 deaths
American male backstroke swimmers
Northwestern Wildcats men's swimmers
Olympic swimmers of the United States
Sportspeople from Fort Wayne, Indiana
Swimmers at the 1932 Summer Olympics
20th-century American people
21st-century American people